Shelley Wickramasinghe (1926–10 August 2011) was a Sri Lankan cricketer.

He studied at the Kalutara Vidyalaya. From 1972 to 2000, he represented Bloomfield Cricket and Athletic Club and served as its president three times.

Wickramasinghe also contributed to cricket administration serving as president of the Mercantile Cricket Association and chairman of the National Sports Council. In the mid-eighties he was also vice-president of Sri Lanka Cricket.

Wickramasinghe died aged 85 on 10 August 2011.

References

External links
Shelley Wickramasinghe dies at 85

1926 births
2011 deaths
Sri Lankan cricketers
Bloomfield Cricket and Athletic Club cricketers
Sri Lankan cricket administrators